Hiroko Shibuya (born 15 June 1947) is a Japanese luger. She competed in the women's singles event at the 1972 Winter Olympics.

References

1947 births
Living people
Japanese female lugers
Olympic lugers of Japan
Lugers at the 1972 Winter Olympics
Sportspeople from Hokkaido